is a former Japanese football player. He played for the Japan national team.

Club career
Natori was born in Saitama on November 12, 1961. After graduating from high school, he joined Mitsubishi Motors (later Urawa Reds) in 1980. The club won the champions in 1980 Emperor's Cup, 1981 JSL Cup and 1982 Japan Soccer League. Although he played as regular player from first season, he also played Division 2 because from the end of the 1980s the club performance was not good. In 1993 and 1994, the club finished at bottom place and he retired in end of 1994 season.

National team career
In August 1979, when Natori was a high school student, he was selected Japan U-20 national team for 1979 World Youth Championship. But, he did not play in the match. On October 26, 1988, he debuted for Japan national team against South Korea. In 1989, he also played at 1990 World Cup qualification. He played 6 games for Japan until 1989.

Club statistics

National team statistics

References

External links
 
 
 Japan National Football Team Database
 

1961 births
Living people
Association football people from Saitama Prefecture
Japanese footballers
Japan international footballers
Japan Soccer League players
J1 League players
Urawa Red Diamonds players
Association football midfielders